Emade (real name Piotr Waglewski) (born December 15, 1981) is a Polish hip-hop producer, brother of rapper Fisz and son of the Polish  musician Wojciech Waglewski, lead vocalist of Voo Voo.

He started out playing percussion at the age of 13 in his own hardcore formation. Few years later he formed RHX group with his brother and Inespe and began his career as a hip-hop producer with their debut album release in 1999. At 20th Przegląd Piosenki Aktorskiej in Wrocław, Poland he accompanied Nick Cave & The Bad Seeds.

In 2001 he produced Inespe's solo debut album Ocean Szarych Bloków. He remixed Smolik's "Who told you" and WWO's "Bezsenne noce" in 2003. The same year his Album producencki was released.

In 2004 he collaborated with his brother on Maria Peszek's album miasto mania. Next year POE's (Projekt Ostry Emade) album Szum rodzi hałas been released.

Emade is the drummer of Polish rock band Kim Nowak, which he founded together with his brother Fisz and Michał Sobolewski in 2008. The band released two studio albums, Kim Nowak (2010) and Wilk (2012).

Discography

Albums

Video albums

References

External links
 Asfalt Records label
 Myspace

1981 births
Living people
Polish record producers
Polish drummers
Male drummers
21st-century drummers
21st-century male musicians